Basic English (British American Scientific International and Commercial English)  is an English-based controlled language created by the linguist and philosopher Charles Kay Ogden as an international auxiliary language, and as an aid for teaching English as a second language. Basic English is, in essence, a simplified subset of regular English. It was presented in Ogden's book Basic English: A General Introduction with Rules and Grammar. The first work on Basic English was written by two Englishmen, Ivor Richards of Harvard University and Charles Kay Ogden of the University of Cambridge in England. The design of Basic English drew heavily on the semiotic theory put forward by Ogden and Richards in their book The Meaning of Meaning.

Ogden's Basic, and the concept of a simplified English, gained its greatest publicity just after the Allied victory in World War II as a means for world peace. He was convinced that the world needed to gradually eradicate minority languages and use as much as possible only one, English in either a simple or complete form. A widely known 1933 book on this is a science fiction work on history up to the year 2106 titled The Shape of Things to Come by H. G. Wells. In this work, Basic English is the inter-language of the future world, a world in which after long struggles a global authoritarian government manages to unite humanity and force everyone to learn it as a second language.

Although Basic English was not built into a program, similar simplifications have been devised for various international uses. Ogden's associate I. A. Richards promoted its use in schools in China. It has influenced the creation of Voice of America's Learning English for news broadcasting, and Simplified Technical English, another English-based controlled language designed to write technical manuals.

What survives of Ogden's Basic English is the basic 850-word list used as the beginner's vocabulary of the English language taught worldwide, especially in Asia.

Design principles 
Ogden tried to simplify English while keeping it normal for native speakers, by specifying grammar restrictions and a controlled small vocabulary which makes an extensive use of paraphrasing. Most notably, Ogden allowed only 18 verbs, which he called "operators".  His "General Introduction" says, "There are no 'verbs' in Basic English", with the underlying assumption that, as noun use in English is very straightforward but verb use/conjugation is not, the elimination of verbs would be a welcome simplification.

Word lists 
Ogden's word lists include only word roots, which in practice are extended with the defined set of affixes and the full set of forms allowed for any available word (noun, pronoun, or the limited set of verbs). The 850 core words of Basic English are found in Wiktionary's Basic English word list. This core is theoretically enough for everyday life. However, Ogden prescribed that any student should learn an additional 150-word list for everyday work in some particular field, by adding a list of 100 words particularly useful in a general field (e.g., science, verse, business, etc.), along with a 50-word list from a more specialised subset of that general field, to make a basic 1000-word vocabulary for everyday work and life.

Moreover, Ogden assumed that any student should already be familiar with (and thus may only review) a core subset of around 200 "international" words. Therefore, a first-level student should graduate with a core vocabulary of around 1200 words. A realistic general core vocabulary could contain around 2000 words (the core 850 words, plus 200 international words, and 1000 words for the general fields of trade, economics, and science). It is enough for a "standard" English level. This 2000 word vocabulary represents "what any learner should know". At this level students could start to move on their own.

Ogden's Basic English 2000 word list and Voice of America's Special English 1500 word list serve as dictionaries for the Simple English Wikipedia.

Rules 
Basic English includes a simple grammar for modifying or combining its 850 words to talk about additional meanings (morphological derivation or inflection). The grammar is based on English, but is much simpler.

 Plural nouns are formed by adding -s or related forms, as in drinks, boxes, or countries.
 Nouns are formed with the endings -er (as in prisoner) or -ing (building).
 Adjectives are formed with the endings -ing (boiling)  or -ed (mixed).
 Adverbs can be formed by adding -ly (for example tightly) to words that Basic English calls "qualities" (adjectives that describe objects).
 The words more and most are used for comparison (for example more complex), but -er and -est may appear in common use (cheaper).
 Negatives can be formed with un- (unwise).
 The word do is used in questions, as it is in English (Do you have some?).
 Both pronouns and what Basic English calls "operators" (a set of ten verbs) use the different forms they have in English (for example I go to him, He goes to me).
 Compound words can be formed by combining two nouns (e.g. soapbox) or a noun and a preposition, which Basic English calls "directives" (sunup).
 International words, words that are the same or similar in English and other European languages (e.g. radio), use the English form. English forms are also used for numbers, dates, money, or measurements.
 Any technical terms or special vocabulary needed for a task should be written in inverted commas and then be explained in the text using words from the Basic English vocabulary (for example the 'vocabulary' is the list of words).

Criticism 
Like all international auxiliary languages (or IALs), Basic English may be criticised as inevitably based on personal preferences, and thus, paradoxically, inherently divisive. Moreover, like all natural language based IALs, Basic is subject to criticism as unfairly biased towards the native speaker community.

As a teaching aid for English as a second language, Basic English has been criticised for the choice of the core vocabulary and for its grammatical constraints.

In 1944, readability expert Rudolf Flesch published an article in Harper's Magazine, "How Basic is Basic English?" in which he said, "It's not basic, and it's not English." The essence of his complaint is that the vocabulary is too restricted, and, as a result, the text ends up being awkward and more difficult than necessary. He also argues that the words in the Basic vocabulary were arbitrarily selected, and notes that there had been no empirical studies showing that it made language simpler.

In his 1948 paper "A Mathematical Theory of Communication", Claude Shannon contrasted the limited vocabulary of Basic English with James Joyce's Finnegans Wake, a work noted for a wide vocabulary. Shannon notes that the lack of vocabulary in Basic English leads to a very high level of redundancy, whereas Joyce's large vocabulary "is alleged to achieve a compression of semantic content."

Literary references 
In the novel The Shape of Things to Come, published in 1933, H. G. Wells depicted Basic English as the lingua franca of a new elite that after a prolonged struggle succeeds in uniting the world and establishing a totalitarian world government. In the future world of Wells' vision, virtually all members of humanity know this language.

From 1942 to 1944 George Orwell was a proponent of Basic English, but in 1945 he became critical of universal languages. Basic English later inspired his use of Newspeak in Nineteen Eighty-Four.

Evelyn Waugh criticized his own 1945 novel Brideshead Revisited, which he had previously called his magnum opus, in the preface of the 1959 reprint: "It [World War II] was a bleak period of present privation and threatening disaster—the period of soya beans and Basic English—and in consequence the book is infused with a kind of gluttony, for food and wine, for the splendours of the recent past, and for rhetorical and ornamental language that now, with a full stomach, I find distasteful."

In his story "Gulf", science fiction writer Robert A. Heinlein used a constructed language called Speedtalk, in which every Basic English word is replaced with a single phoneme, as an appropriate means of communication for a race of genius supermen.

Samples
The Lord's Prayer has been often used for an impressionistic language comparison:

See also

Notes

References

Further reading 
 I. A. Richards & Christine Gibson, Learning Basic English: A Practical Handbook for English-Speaking People, New York: W. W. Norton & Co. (1945)
 Basic English: A Protest, Joseph Albert Lauwerys, F. J. Daniels, Robert A. Hall Jr., London: Basic English Foundation, 1966. An answer to Robert A. Hall, Jr.'s criticism.
 (eo) Vĕra Barandovská-Frank, (2020), Basic English, In:  Interlingvistiko. Enkonduko en la sciencon pri planlingvoj (PDF), p. 270-275, Poznań, Univ. Adam Mickiewicz, 333 pp., ISBN 9788365483539

External links 

 Charles Kay Ogden, Basic English: A General Introduction with Rules and Grammar, London: Paul Treber
 Charles Kay Ogden, Basic English and Grammatical Reform, Cambridge: The Orthological Institute. (1937)e
 Ogden.Basic-English.org, Ogden's books and word lists online and several discussions
 Basic-English.org, Ongoing project to support and update Ogden's Basic (with downloads)
 The Reference Shelf Vol. 17. No. 1, a discussion about Basic English, with supporters and critics
 Charles Kay Ogden, Basic English Course (1930)
 Augusto Ghio Del'Rio, Inglés Básico, 1954 translation of Ogden's Basic English Course for Spanish Speakers
 Simple English Helper Tool — Detect words which are not in a given dictionary, Ogden's Basic English dictionary list included
 Essential World English — some criticisms of Basic English and suggestions for overcoming its problems

International auxiliary languages
Technical communication
English language
Controlled English
Constructed languages introduced in the 1930s
1930 introductions